The Zeiss Otus 1.4/55 is a manual focus standard prime lens for Canon Inc. and Nikon DSLR bodies. It was announced by Zeiss on 7 October 2013.

It is noted for producing a sharp image, with good correction for chromatic and spherical aberration as well as distortion. It produces pleasant bokeh, but vignettes strongly on full frame bodies at its maximum aperture.

References

External links
Zeiss Otus 55mm F1.4: Digital Photography Review
ZEISS Consumer Products

Otus 55
Otus 55
Camera lenses introduced in 2013